Adam Smith (1723–1790) was a moral philosopher, author and economics pioneer.

Adam Smith may also refer to:

Sports
 Adam Smith (coach) (born 1971), English football coach and former footballer
 Adam Smith (American football) (born 1990), American football offensive guard
 Adam Smith (basketball) (born 1992), basketball player for Hapoel Holon in the Israel Basketball Premier League
 Adam Smith (cricketer) (born 1976), Australian cricketer
 Adam Smith (footballer, born February 1985), English footballer for Chesterfield, Mansfield Town, Lincoln City, and others
 Adam Smith (footballer, born September 1985), English footballer playing for Lowestoft Town
 Adam Smith (footballer, born 1991), English footballer playing for A.F.C. Bournemouth
 Adam Smith (footballer, born 1992), English footballer playing for Stevenage
 Adam Smith (ice hockey) (born 1976), Canadian player
 Adam Smith (swimmer) (1903–1985), American freestyle swimmer who competed in the 1924 Summer Olympics

Others
 Adam Smith (director) (fl. 1990s–2020s), British television director
 Adam Smith (EastEnders), fictional character in EastEnders
 Adam Smith (Washington politician) (born 1965), U.S. representative from Washington
 Adam Smith (Kentucky) (born 1977), American political activist
 Adam Smith, pseudonym of George Goodman (1930–2014), American economics writer and commentator
 Adam Smith (Torchwood), fictional character in Torchwood
 Adam Neal Smith (fl. 2000s), American actor, musician and film composer
 Adam T. Smith (fl. 1990s–2010s), American professor of anthropology at Cornell University
 Adam D. Smith (fl. 2000s–2010s), professor of computer science at Boston University
Adam Smith (Kansas politician) (fl. 2010s–2020s), member of the Kansas House of Representatives
 Adam Smith (YouTuber) (fl. 2010s–2020s), Australian doctor and YouTuber
 Adam Smith (TV series), a 1972 British series

See also 
 Adam Smith College, Fife, Scotland
 Adam Smith Institute, free-market UK think tank
 Adam Smith University, defunct, controversial, unaccredited, private distance learning university based in Liberia
 Adam Smyth (born 1981), English cricketer

Smith, Adam